Vendetta or Blood Revenge (German: Blutrache) is a 1919 German silent drama film directed by Georg Jacoby starring Pola Negri, Emil Jannings and Harry Liedtke. It was shot at the Tempelhof Studios in Berlin.

Cast
Pola Negri as Marianna Paoli  
Emil Jannings as Tomasso  
Harry Liedtke as Edwin Alcott  
Magnus Stifter as Count Danella
Fred Immler as Antonio Paoli, Mariana's brother
Emil Biron as Washington Irving
Käthe Dorsch as Ruth Alcott  
Margarete Kupfer as Lady Crawford, Ruth's aunt

References

External links

Films of the Weimar Republic
Films directed by Georg Jacoby
German silent feature films
UFA GmbH films
Films set in Corsica
Films set in Monaco
German black-and-white films
German drama films
1919 drama films
Silent drama films
1910s German films
Films shot at Tempelhof Studios